Mauro Bellugi (7 February 1950 – 20 February 2021) was an Italian footballer who played as a defender.

Club career
Bellugi started his career with Inter Milan, making his debut for them on 31 August 1969 in a Coppa Italia match. In five seasons with Inter he played 90 Serie A matches, and 137 times in all senior competitions.

Bellugi later also played for Bologna F.C. (1974–79), S.S.C. Napoli (1979–80) and A.C. Pistoiese (1980–81).

International career
Bellugi played 31 matches for the Italy national football team from 1972 to 1979. He played five games in the 1978 FIFA World Cup, where Italy managed a fourth-place finish, and was also in the squad for the 1974 tournament. His final game for Italy was against Switzerland in Udine on 17 November 1979. He was an unused member of the Italian squad that managed a fourth-place finish at UEFA Euro 1980 on home soil.

Death
Bellugi died from complications of COVID-19 during the COVID-19 pandemic in Italy, thirteen days after his 71st birthday.

References

1950 births
2021 deaths
Sportspeople from the Province of Siena
Italian footballers
Association football defenders
Italy international footballers
1974 FIFA World Cup players
1978 FIFA World Cup players
UEFA Euro 1980 players
Inter Milan players
Bologna F.C. 1909 players
S.S.C. Napoli players
U.S. Pistoiese 1921 players
Serie A players
Deaths from the COVID-19 pandemic in Lombardy
Footballers from Tuscany